The British Columbia Dragoons (BCD) is a Primary Reserve armoured reconnaissance regiment of the Canadian Army.  It is based in Kelowna and Vernon, British Columbia, and is part of 3rd Canadian Division's 39 Canadian Brigade Group.

Detachments
Regimental Headquarters (Kelowna)
A Squadron (Vernon)
B Squadron (Kelowna)

Lineage

The British Columbia Dragoons 

 Originated on 1 April 1911, in Vernon, British Columbia, as one of two four-squadron regiments designated the British Columbia Horse.
 Reorganized on 1 December 1911, as the 1st Regiment, British Columbia Horse.
 Redesignated on 15 April 1912, as the 30th Regiment, British Columbia Horse.
 Redesignated on 15 March 1920, as The British Columbia Mounted Rifles.
 Redesignated on 15 March 1929, as The British Columbia Dragoons.
 Redesignated on 11 February 1941, as the 2nd (Reserve) Regiment, The British Columbia Dragoons.
 Redesignated on 1 April 1941, as the 9th (Reserve) Armoured Regiment, (The British Columbia Dragoons).
 Redesignated on 1 April 1946, as the 9th Reconnaissance Regiment (The British Columbia Dragoons), RCAC.
 Redesignated on 4 February 1949, as The British Columbia Dragoons (9th Reconnaissance Regiment).
 Redesignated on 19 May 1958, as The British Columbia Dragoons.

Lineage chart 
Lineage of the British Columbia Dragoons:

|style="text-align: left;"| class="wikitable"
+ Abbreviations used in the chart
-
! Abbreviation !! Phrase
-
 Armd  Armoured
-
 Bn  Battalion
-
 CAC  Canadian Armoured Corps
-
 CASF  Canadian Active Service Force
-
 Cav.  Cavalry
-
 CEF  Canadian Expeditionary Force
-
 RCAC  Royal Canadian Armoured Corps
-
 Recce  Reconnaissance
-
 Regt  Regiment
-
 Sqn  Squadron

History

Early history 
The British Columbia Dragoons trace their origins to the formation of the Canadian Mounted Rifles, two independent squadrons of horse in Kamloops and Vernon in 1908. In 1910 two additional squadrons were raised and the regiment was renamed the British Columbia Horse. In 1912 the unit was reorganized into two separate regiments: the 30th Regiment, British Columbia Horse and the 31st Regiment, British Columbia Horse (later known as the British Columbia Hussars). 1914 saw the formation of the Victoria Independent Squadron on Vancouver Island.

First World War 
In the Great War the regiment was not mobilized, but in December 1914 many volunteers from the regiment joined the newly formed 2nd Regiment Canadian Mounted Rifles. After some limited service in France as cavalry, the unit was reroled to infantry as 2nd Canadian Mounted Rifles Battalion on January 1, 1916. The battalion became part of the 8th Canadian Infantry Brigade, and fought with great luck and success on the Western Front. Despite being trained as cavalry but deployed as infantry, the regiment managed the war well. Captain "Jock" MacGregor was awarded the Victoria Cross for actions taken in the battle at Cambrai on September 29, 1918. The actions and awards of the 2nd Canadian Mounted Rifles are perpetuated today by the British Columbia Dragoons, their direct descendants.

The British Columbia Dragoons perpetuate the following units of the Canadian Expeditionary Force:
 2nd Battalion, Canadian Mounted Rifles
 11th Regiment, Canadian Mounted Rifles

1920s-1930s 
In the post-war reorganization, the regiment was renamed The British Columbia Mounted Rifles in 1920, and then to the name still carried today, The British Columbia Dragoons in 1929.  Part of the reason for the change was to forever divorce the regiment from infantry duties. When the Second World War loomed, the regiment once again stepped forward.

Second World War 
The regiment was designated the 5th Motorcycle Regiment (BCD), and later an armoured car unit. Finally made into an armoured regiment, the 9th Armoured Regiment (BCD), they were deployed to Italy as part of the 5th Armoured Brigade, 5th Canadian (Armoured) Division. The regiment saw heavy action in the Liri Valley, were the first unit to break through the Gustav Line in Italy, 1944, and helped smash the Gothic Line, holding Point 204 right in the centre of the line. Part of the "D-Day Dodgers", a term used by soldiers fighting in Italy after D-Day, they continued to fight until orders were given to move the regiment to the northwest Europe area.  They served with distinction until the end of the war, at which point the regiment was demobilized and returned to Militia service.

Post war to present 

The regiment has since seen many ups and downs, with losses of manpower and funding, hostile popular attitudes, and the ever-changing nature of Canada. The 1970s and 1980s saw the deployment of individual members to Cyprus as part of the UN operations there as part of larger Canadian formations. The 1990s and the new century has seen numerous members deploy to Bosnia as part of NATO operations with the Implementation Force and the Stabilisation Force in Bosnia and Herzegovina. With the Global War on Terror, members served overseas as part of NATO operations with the International Security Assistance Force in Afghanistan and Operation Impact in the Middle East as well as on Operation Reassurance in Latvia, and on Operation Unifier in Ukraine prior to the 2022 Russian invasion of Ukraine.

Official links to other units 
 Alliance
 Between Canadian and Commonwealth units
 — The Royal Dragoon Guards
 Partnership
 Informal bond of friendship between a Canadian unit and a unit from an allied country
 — 161st Infantry Regiment

Battle honours
Battle honours in small capitals are for large operations and campaigns and those in lowercase are for more specific battles. Bold type indicates honours authorized to be emblazoned on the regimental guidon.

Great War

Second World War

War in Afghanistan

Recognition
The Freedom of the City was granted by the City of Kelowna on February 11, 1963.
The Freedom of the City was exercised by The British Columbia Dragoons in Vernon, British Columbia, on 10 May 2008.

Cadet units
There are several Royal Canadian Army Cadets units spread across British Columbia which are affiliated to the British Columbia Dragoons. 

Cadet units affiliated to the British Columbia Dragoons receive support from the regiment and also are given permission to wear traditional regimental accoutrements on their uniforms.

Media
''Sinews of Steel: The History of the British Columbia Dragoons" by R[eginald] H. Roy (1965)

See also 

 List of regiments of cavalry of the Canadian Militia (1900–1920)

References

External links
 
 Regimental association

Order of precedence

Dragoon regiments of Canada
Kelowna
Vernon, British Columbia
Military units and formations of British Columbia
Armoured regiments & units of Canada in World War II
1908 establishments in British Columbia
Military units and formations established in 1908